Flying S Ranch Airport  is a private airport located approximately  northeast of Caliente, California.

History
During World War II it was a United States Army Airfield, known as Caliente Flight Strip.  It was one of the many Flight Strips which were built by the USAAF during the war for the emergency use of military aircraft.

The Caliente Flight Strip was listed on a table of Second Air Force Flight Strips which indicated that construction of the strip was completed in 1943. The strip was described as consisting of a 6,400' paved runway, adjacent to the south side of Route 93 but labeled merely as “FS-2”.  It is not known what military use (if any) the Caliente Flight Strip ever had.

Sold by the WAA as a private airport after the war, the airfield was sold in July 1967 to its present owners.

References

 Shaw, Frederick J. (2004), Locating Air Force Base Sites History’s Legacy, Air Force History and Museums Program, United States Air Force, Washington DC, 2004.

External links
 

Flight Strips of the United States Army Air Forces
Airfields of the United States Army Air Forces in California
Airports in Kern County, California